Veryard is a surname. Notable people with the surname include:

Charles Veryard (1900–1967), Australian politician, grandson of John
John Veryard (1851–1924), Australian politician
Richard Veryard (born 1955), British computer scientist, author, and business consultant